Australian herbs and spices were used by Aboriginal peoples to flavour food in ground ovens. The term "spice" is applied generally to the non-leafy range of strongly flavoured dried Australian bushfoods. They mainly consist of aromatic fruits and seed products, although Australian wild peppers also have spicy leaves. There are also a few aromatic leaves but unlike culinary herbs from other cultures which often come from small soft-stemmed forbs, the Australian herb species are generally trees from rainforests, open forests and woodlands.

Australian herbs and spices are generally dried and ground to produce a powdered or flaked spice, either used as a single ingredient or in blends.

They were used to a limited extent by colonists in the 18th and 19th centuries. Some extracts were used as flavouring during the 20th century. Australian native spices have become more widely recognized and used by non-indigenous people since the early 1980s as part of the bushfood industry, with increasing gourmet use and export.

They can also be used as a fresh product. Leaves can be used whole, like a bay-leaf in cooking, or spicy fruits are added to various dishes for flavour.

The distilled essential oils from leaves and twigs are also used as flavouring products.

Fruit 
 Acronychia acidula, Lemon Aspen
 Acronychia oblongifolia, White Aspen, Yellow Wood
 Austromyrtus dulcis, Midgen Berry, Silky Myrtle
 Citrus australasica, Finger Lime, Caviar Lime
 Citrus australis, Round Lime, Australian Lime
 Citrus glauca, Desert Lime
 Eupomatia laurina, Bolwarra, Native Guava, Copper Laurel
 Kunzea pomifera, Muntries,  Emu Apples, Native Cranberries
 Solanum centrale, Akudjura, Australian Desert Raisin
 Solanum chippendalei, Chippendale's Tomato, Bush Tomato
 Solanum cleistogamum, Potato Bush, Bush Tomato
 Syzygium luehmannii, Riberry, Cherry Alder, Small Leaf Lilly Pilly

Herbs 
 Apium insulare, Flinders Island Celery
 Apium prostratum, Sea Celery
 Atherosperma Moschatum, safrole, Southern Sassafras
 Atriplex nummularia, Old Man Salt Bush
 Backhousia citriodora, citral chemovar, Lemon Myrtle
 Backhousia myrtifolia, elemicin chemovar, Cinnamon Myrtle
 Boronia safrolifera, safrole
 Crowea exalata, exalaticin
 Cinnamomum oliveri, safrole, Oliver's Cinnamon
 Cymbopogon refractus, Barbed wire grass
 Doryphora sassafras, safrole
 Doryphora aromatica, safrole
 Eucalyptus dives, piperitone chemovar, Peppermint Gum
 Eucalyptus globulus, cineole chemovar, Tasmanian Blue Gum
 Eucalyptus olida, methyl cinnamate chemovar, Strawberry Gum
 Eucalyptus polybractea, Blue-leaved Mallee
 Eucalyptus staigeriana, Lemon Ironbark
 Melaleuca quinquenervia, Broad-leaf Paperbark
 Melaleuca leucadendron, Weeping Paperbark
 Mentha australis, River Mint
 Mentha diemenica, Slender Mint
 Mentha satureioides
 Ocimum tenuiflorum, Holy Basil
 Prostanthera incisa var. incisa, Cut-leaf Mintbush
 Prostanthera rotundifolia, Native Thyme
 Syzygium anisatum, trans-E-Anethole chemovar, Aniseed myrtle
 Zieria smithii, safrole

Spices
 Acacia victoriae, Gundabluey, Wattleseed
 Alpinia caerulea, Native Ginger
 Tasmannia lanceolata, Mountain Pepper
 Tasmannia stipitata, Dorrigo Pepper
 Tasmannia insipida, Brush Pepper Bush
 Tasmannia xerophila, Alpine Pepperbush

References

External links

Lists of plants
Gardening lists
Bushfood
Flora of Australia
Herbs And Spices
Spices
Herbs